The Earthly Sovereign was the second Chinese legendary king after Pangu's era. According to Yiwen Leiju, he was the second of the Three Sovereigns.

Biography
According to the "Basic Annals of the Three Sovereigns" (三皇本紀) in Sima Zhen’s supplement to the Records of the Grand Historian:

Dìhuáng had eleven heads, was the king ruling under the influence (de) of the fire element (火德王).
And, Dìhuáng was a king of many achievements, had eleven brothers, died aged eighteen thousand years old.

After he was born, the world was filled in chaos. That year, the sun and the moon born from two eyes of Pangu, the stars from Pangu’s hairs couldn't move smoothly and correctly, which caused many days without sun, or many days with the sun shined throughout the whole day, or many dangerous fallen star accidents. With his power, Dìhuáng corrected the false. He made the sun and the moon move correctly, and stipulated the days of a month and the months of a year.

Dìhuáng's rule lasted eleven thousand years.

He created Mount Xiong'er (熊耳山 Xióng'ĕr Shān) and Mount Longmen (龍門山 Lóngmén Shān). His successor was the Human Sovereign.

See also
Chinese mythology

References 

|-

Legendary monarchs
Three Sovereigns and Five Emperors
Chinese monarchs